Cyclotrachelus is a genus of beetles in the family Carabidae, containing the following species:

 Cyclotrachelus alabamae (Vandyke, 1926)
 Cyclotrachelus alabamensis (Casey, 1920)
 Cyclotrachelus alternans (Casey, 1920)
 Cyclotrachelus approximatus (Leconte, 1848)
 Cyclotrachelus blatchleyi (Casey, 1918)
 Cyclotrachelus brevoorti (Leconte, 1848)
 Cyclotrachelus constrictus (Say, 1823)
 Cyclotrachelus convivus (Leconte, 1852)
 Cyclotrachelus dejeanellus (Csiki, 1930)
 Cyclotrachelus engelmani (Leconte, 1852)
 Cyclotrachelus faber (Germar, 1824)
 Cyclotrachelus floridensis (Freitag, 1969)
 Cyclotrachelus freitagi Bousquet, 1993
 Cyclotrachelus fucatus (Freitag, 1969)
 Cyclotrachelus furtivus (Leconte, 1852)
 Cyclotrachelus gigas (Casey, 1918)
 Cyclotrachelus gravesi (Freitag, 1969)
 Cyclotrachelus gravidus (Haldeman, 1853)
 Cyclotrachelus hernandensis (Vandyke, 1943)
 Cyclotrachelus heros (Say, 1823)
 Cyclotrachelus hypherpiformis (Freitag, 1969)
 Cyclotrachelus incisus (Leconte, 1848)
 Cyclotrachelus iowensis (Freitag, 1969)
 Cyclotrachelus iuvenis (Freitag, 1969)
 Cyclotrachelus laevipennis (Leconte, 1848)
 Cyclotrachelus levifaber (Freitag, 1969)
 Cyclotrachelus macrovulum (Freitag, 1969)
 Cyclotrachelus nonnitens (Leconte, 1873)
 Cyclotrachelus ovulum (Chaudoir, 1868)
 Cyclotrachelus parafaber (Freitag, 1969)
 Cyclotrachelus parasodalis (Freitag, 1969)
 Cyclotrachelus sallei (Leconte, 1873)
 Cyclotrachelus seximpressus (Leconte, 1848)
 Cyclotrachelus sigillatus (Say, 1823)
 Cyclotrachelus sinus (Freitag, 1969)
 Cyclotrachelus sodalis (Leconte, 1848)
 Cyclotrachelus spoliatus (Newman, 1838)
 Cyclotrachelus substriatus (Leconte, 1848)
 Cyclotrachelus texensis (Freitag, 1969)
 Cyclotrachelus torvus (Leconte, 1863)
 Cyclotrachelus unicolor (Say, 1823)
 Cyclotrachelus vinctus (Leconte, 1852)
 Cyclotrachelus whitcombi (Freitag, 1969)

References

Pterostichinae